Karakum District or Garagum District  is a district of Mary Province in Turkmenistan. The administrative center of the district is the town of Karakum. It is formed in 1978 as Karakum Raion and was renamed to its current name in 1992.

Districts of Turkmenistan
Mary Region